I Know What You Did Last Summer is a 1997 American slasher film directed by Jim Gillespie, written by Kevin Williamson, and starring Jennifer Love Hewitt, Sarah Michelle Gellar, Ryan Phillippe and Freddie Prinze Jr. It is loosely based on the 1973 novel of the same name by Lois Duncan and is the first installment in the I Know What You Did Last Summer franchise. The film centers on four young friends who are stalked by a hook-wielding killer one year after covering up a car accident in which they supposedly killed a man. The film also draws inspiration from the urban legend known as "The Hook" and the 1980s slasher films Prom Night (1980) and The House on Sorority Row (1982).

Prior to Scream Williamson was approached to adapt Duncan's source novel by producer Erik Feig. Where Williamson's screenplay for Scream contained prominent elements of satire and self-referentiality, his adaptation of I Know What You Did Last Summer reworked the novel's central plot to resemble a straightforward 1980s-era slasher film. After the success of Scream, the film was rushed into production.

I Know What You Did Last Summer was released theatrically on October 17, 1997. It received mixed reviews from critics, but was commercially successful, grossing $125 million worldwide on a budget of $17 million, and remaining number 1 at the U.S. box office for three consecutive weeks. It was also nominated for and won multiple awards. The movie has also been parodied and referenced in popular culture, and credited alongside Scream with revitalizing the slasher genre in the 1990s.

The film was followed by a direct sequel, I Still Know What You Did Last Summer (1998), with the main surviving characters returning. Later, a direct-to-video sequel was made called I'll Always Know What You Did Last Summer (2006). It did not feature any of the original cast and, though it briefly mentioned the other movies, it isn't considered to be part of the same continuity or a true sequel. At one point, a remake was planned. In 2021, a television series was released. As of 2023, a legacy sequel is in the works.

Plot
On July 4, 1996, in Southport, North Carolina, Julie James and her friends Ray Bronson, Helen Shivers, and Barry Cox drive to the beach. While driving along a coastal byway, they accidentally hit a pedestrian. Julie's friend Max Neurick passes by them on the road. Julie reassures Max of their well-being, and he leaves. The group decides to dump the body in the water, but the pedestrian wakes up and attacks Helen. She struggles and he falls into the water. The group flees the docks and swears to never discuss what happened.

One year later in 1997, Julie returns home from college for the summer. The friends have gone their separate ways. Julie receives a letter with no return address, stating, "I know what you did last summer!" Julie tracks down Helen, and they take the note to Barry, who suspects Max. They confront Max on the docks, and Barry threatens him with a hook. Julie meets Ray, who now works as a fisherman. Later, Max is killed by a figure in a rain slicker wielding a hook. Later that night, Barry discovers a picture of his car in his gym locker with the words "I KNOW" written on the back of it. He is then ambushed by the same assailant stealing and driving his car.

Julie researches newspaper articles, believing that the man they ran over was a local named David Egan. Helen and Julie meet with David's sister Missy at her home. Missy explains that their family was devastated by David's death and that a friend of his named Billy Blue visited her to pay his respects. That night, the killer sneaks into Helen's house, cuts off her hair while she sleeps and writes "SOON" in lipstick on her mirror.

The following morning, Julie finds Max's corpse wearing Barry's stolen jacket and covered in crabs in the trunk of her car. When she calls the others, the body and the crabs are missing. Julie, Helen and Barry confront Ray about the recent events. The latter claims to also have received a threatening letter. Julie goes back to visit Missy, while Barry and Helen participate in the 4th of July parade. Missy reveals David allegedly committed suicide out of guilt for the death of his girlfriend, Susie Willis, in a car accident and shows David's suicide note to Julie. As the writing matches that of the note she received, Julie realizes it was not a suicide note, but a death threat.

At the Croaker Beauty Pageant, Helen witnesses Barry being murdered on the balcony. She rushes upstairs with a police officer, but finds no sign of the killer or Barry. The police officer is escorting Helen home when the killer lures him into an alley and murders him. Helen runs to her family's store, where her sister Elsa is closing for the night. The killer enters the store and murders Elsa. Helen is chased upstairs and escapes through a window, falling to an alleyway. She runs toward the street, but the killer stops her and slashes her to death, her screams unheard by the ongoing parade.

Julie finds an article mentioning Susie's father, Ben Willis, and realizes Ben was the man that they ran over, moments after he killed David to avenge his daughter. She goes to the docks to tell Ray, but notices Ray's boat is called Billy Blue and flees from him. A fisherman appears and knocks Ray unconscious, inviting Julie to hide on his boat. On the boat, she finds photos and articles about her and her friends, and pictures of Susie. The boat leaves the docks, and the fisherman is revealed to be Ben Willis. He chases Julie below deck, where she uncovers the bodies of his victims, including Helen, and Barry, in the boat's icebox. Ray regains consciousness and steals a motorboat to rescue Julie. He ultimately uses the rigging to sever Ben's hand and send him overboard. When Julie and Ray are questioned by the police, they deny knowing why Ben attempted to kill them, but are relieved not to have actually killed anyone, and reconcile.

A year later in 1998, Julie is in college in Boston. As she enters the shower, she notices the words "I still know" written in the steam on the shower door. Moments later, a dark figure crashes through it as Julie screams.

Cast

 Jennifer Love Hewitt as Julie James
 Sarah Michelle Gellar as Helen Shivers
 Ryan Phillippe as Barry Cox
 Freddie Prinze Jr. as Ray Bronson
 Bridgette Wilson as Elsa Shivers
 Anne Heche as Melissa "Missy" Egan
 Muse Watson as Ben Willis / The Fisherman
 Johnny Galecki as Max Neurick
 Stuart Greer as Officer

Production

Development and writing
I Know What You Did Last Summer was a screenplay penned by Kevin Williamson several years beforehand, which was then rushed into production by Columbia Pictures upon the success of the Williamson-written Scream (1996). It was based on the 1973 novel of the same name by Lois Duncan, a youth-oriented suspense novel about four young people who are involved in a hit-and-run accident involving a young boy. Producer Erik Feig pitched the idea of a screen adaptation to Mandalay Entertainment, and subsequently appointed Williamson to retool the core elements of Duncan's novel, rendering a screenplay more akin to a 1980s slasher film Inspired by his father, who had been a commercial fisherman, Williamson changed the setting of the novel to a small fishing village, and made the villain a hook-wielding fisherman.

The killer's arming of himself with a hook is a reference to the urban legend "The Hook", which the four main characters recount at the beginning of the film around a campfire. According to Williamson, he wrote the scene as a way of indicating what was to come: "Basically what I was doing was I was setting the framework to say, 'All right, audience: That's that legend. Now here's a new one.'" Unlike Williamson's screenplay for the film's contemporary, Scream, which incorporated satire of the slasher film, I Know What You Did Last Summer was written more as a straightforward slasher film. Gillespie commented in 2008: "The joy of this film for me as a filmmaker was in taking [the] elements that we've seen before, and saying to the audience: 'Here's something you've seen before'—knowing that they're saying 'We've seen this before'—and still getting them to jump." Gillespie also claimed that he felt Williamson's screenplay did not resemble a "slasher horror movie" and that he saw it rather as simply "a really good story" with a morality tale embedded within it.

Pre-production
According to producer Stokely Chaffin, the producers sought out actors who were "beautiful, but likable". Director Gillespie recalled that, though he had been unfamiliar with the screenplay's source material, that "roughly 60 to 65%" of the young women auditioning had read the novel as children. Jennifer Love Hewitt, who at the time was mainly known for her role on the television series Party of Five, was cast in the lead of Julie James based on her "ability to project vulnerability", which the producers, director Gillespie and writer Williamson unanimously agreed upon. Initially, Hewitt was considered for the role of Helen. Melissa Joan Hart was offered a role, but she turned it down, because she felt that the film was a rip-off of Scream. For the role of Barry, the crew had envisioned an actor with a " quarterback" appearance, as the character had been written as an intimidating figure. Ryan Phillippe was ultimately cast in the part based on his audition, despite the fact that he was not as physically tall as the script had called for. Director Gillespie chose Freddie Prinze Jr. for the role of Ray, because he felt Prinze himself had an "everyman" quality much like the character.

Sarah Michelle Gellar was the last of the lead performers to be cast in the role of Helen. Like Hewitt, Gellar was also known to American audiences at the time for her roles in television, primarily as the titular Buffy Summers on Buffy the Vampire Slayer. Gillespie commented on casting Gellar: "I wanted an actress that had a warmth to her, but could still come off as being a bitch." For the supporting role of Missy, Gillespie sought an actress with significant screen presence, as the character, despite appearing in only two scenes, is central to several major plot points. Anne Heche was cast in the role, which she recalled as being two days' worth of work that required her to "be scary".

Filming

Scottish director Jim Gillespie was hired to direct the film after being suggested by writer Williamson. Star Hewitt would later state in 2008 that Gillespie was to date her "favorite director [she's] ever worked with." Principal photography began on March 31, 1997 and took place over a period of ten weeks throughout the late spring-early summer of 1997. Approximately seven weeks of the ten-week shoot took place at night, which Gillespie says was difficult for the cast and crew, and also created commotion in primary small-town locations in which they shot. Gillespie devised a color scheme with cinematographer Denis Crossan which was marked by heavy blues throughout and a notable lack of bright colors.

For the beginning of the film, coastal areas of Sonoma County, California stood in for North Carolina, where the film is set. The opening shots of the sun setting on a rugged coast were filmed at Kolmer Gulch, just north of the town of Jenner, on Highway 1. The car crash scene was also filmed on Highway 1 in the same area. The scene in which the four friends are seated around a campfire on the beach next to a wrecked boat was inspired by a painting Gillespie had seen in a reference book; to achieve the image, the art department purchased an old boat in Bodega Bay, cut it in half and placed it at the beach location.

The remaining scenes were filmed primarily around the town of Southport, North Carolina. Specific sites included the Amuzu Theater, where the beauty pageant is held, the Old Yacht Basin and Southport Fish Company. Julie's house is on Short Street just north of Southport Marina. The daytime sequences shot on the marina show multiple vessels traversing the water; though real vessels, the boat traffic was orchestrated by a marine traffic coordinator to make the waterway appear lively. The Shiver's Department Store setting in the film was discovered on location in Southport by director Gillespie, who was so impressed by the location that he reworked elements of the script in order to incorporate it into the film; it eventually became the primary setting for Helen's extended chase sequence with the killer. The exterior sequences of Julie's Boston college campus were in fact shot at Duke University, while the hospital sequence was filmed at Southport's Dosher Memorial Hospital in an unused wing of the hospital.

The final sequence on the boat was shot on an actual water-bound vessel on the Cape Fear River, which proved difficult for the actors and crew. According to Gillespie, the filmmakers nearly lost the boat while attempting to dock it due to the volatile waters, after which they were forced to leave and shoot other footage until the following day.

Post-production
Gillespie chose to film virtually no onscreen blood as he did not want the film to be overly gratuitous in terms of violence. The scene in which Elsa has her throat slashed while standing against a glass door had originally been shot from behind without any blood appearing on the glass. However, producer Feig worried that the scene appeared "medically impossible" after which Gillespie re-shot it (post-principal photography) with a visual effect of blood spattering across the glass. Upon test screenings of the film, Gillespie and the producers decided that a death sequence needed to occur earlier in the film to establish a sense of legitimate danger for the main characters. The scene in which Max is murdered in the crab factory was subsequently filmed and implemented into the final cut to achieve this (in the original script, his character was not killed).

The original ending of the film featured a sequence in which Julie receives an email reading: "I Still Know". This ending was scrapped for the more dramatic ending featured in the final cut of the film, in which Julie finds the same message scrawled on a shower stall just before the killer comes crashing through the glass. This footage was also shot after principal photography, on a soundstage next-door to where Hewitt was filming Party of Five.

Music
The film produced two soundtracks. One of them featured the score composed by John Debney, while the other contained various rock songs found in the film.

Additional songs featured in the film (but not on a soundtrack):
 "Forgotten Too" by Ugly Beauty
 "Wake Up Call" by The Mighty Mighty Bosstones
 "Where Did You Sleep Last Night" by Lead Belly
 "You're a Grand Old Flag" by George M. Cohan
 "Beautiful Girl" by Bing Crosby
 "Free" by Ultra Naté

Marketing and release
In anticipation of the film's release, distributor Columbia Pictures began a summer marketing campaign that presented the film as being "From the creator of Scream." Miramax Films subsequently filed a lawsuit against Columbia, arguing the claim was inaccurate as the director of Scream was Wes Craven, not Williamson. The week following the film's theatrical release, a federal judge awarded Miramax an injunction requiring that Columbia remove the claim from their advertising campaign. Williamson had requested its removal prior after seeing it on a theater poster.

Miramax won a subsequent lawsuit against Columbia during a March 1998 hearing. In a press release, executive Bob Weinstein noted plans to "vigorously pursue" damage claims against Columbia Pictures for their use of the claim.

Reception

Box office
I Know What You Did Last Summer opened theatrically in North America on October 17, 1997. The film had been made on a $17 million budget, yet already in its opening weekend it grossed $15,818,645 in 2,524 theaters in the United States and Canada, ranking number one; it remained in the number one position for an additional two weekends. By the end of its theatrical run in December 1997, it had grossed $72,586,134 in the U.S. and Canada and $53 million in other countries for a worldwide total of $126 million.

According to data compiled by Box Office Mojo, I Know What You Did Last Summer is the seventh highest-grossing slasher film as of 2021.

In retrospect, Jim Gillespie said: “It was meant to be kind of a stand-alone revisit of those classic '80s horror films. It worked! The movie was number one three weeks in a row. It just clicked with the audience. The title clicked and everything just seemed to work. Third week was Halloween weekend and it was number one in its third week. I couldn't believe it stuck there for three weeks.“

Critical response
On review aggregator Rotten Tomatoes, the film holds an approval rating of 44% based on 73 reviews, with an average rating of 5.40/10. The site's critics consensus reads: "A by-the-numbers slasher that arrived a decade too late, the mostly tedious I Know What You Did Last Summer will likely only hook diehard fans of the genre." On Metacritic it has a weighted average score of 52 out of 100 based on reviews from 17 critics, indicating "mixed or average reviews". Audiences polled by CinemaScore gave the film an average grade of "B−" on an A+ to F scale.

The film inevitably drew both positive and negative comparisons to Scream, also written by Williamson. Mick LaSalle considered the movie inferior to its predecessor. Richard Harrington, on the other hand, cited IKWYDLS as superior to Scream; he described the newer picture as "... a smart and sharply-drawn genre-film with a moral center, and with a solid cast of young actors to hold it." Derek Elley of Variety was also enthusiastic, calling the film a "polished genre piece with superior fright elements that should perform at better-than-average theatrical levels." Roger Ebert gave the movie one of four stars and wrote that "The best shot in this film is the first one. Not a good sign." Entertainment Weekly praised Jennifer Love Hewitt's performance, noting that she "knows how to scream with soul".

Lawrence Van Gelder of The New York Times wrote of the picture: "This isn't real life. It's the grand guignol of I Know What You Did Last Summer, laying its claim to succeed Scream as a high-grossing and blood-drenched date-night crowd-pleaser. And why shouldn't it?" James Kendrick of the Q Network wrote that "Williamson's characters are all generic types; but they're still believable as people, and they react realistically according to the situations." Kendrick added that the film was "head and shoulders above earlier 'dead teenager' movies".

TV Guides Maitland McDonagh awarded the movie two out of five stars, noting: "Screenwriter Kevin Williamson takes a step backward and writes the kind of movie Scream mocks. You can see him now, soaking up videos of Friday the 13th and Halloween—not to mention the lesser likes of He Knows You're Alone, Terror Train and My Bloody Valentine—and saying, 'I can do that!' And boy, does he ever."

Critic James Berardinelli credited both IKWYDLS and Scream with igniting a new boom of slasher films, adding: "There is one minor aspect of the plot that elevates I Know What You Did Last Summer above the level of a typical '80s slasher flick -- it has an interesting subtext. I'm referring to the way the lives and friendships of these four individuals crumble in the wake of their accident. Guilt, confusion and doubt build in them until they can no longer stand to be with each other or look at themselves in the mirror. Sadly, this potentially-fascinating element of the movie is dismissed quickly to facilitate a higher body count. And, as I said before, a few extra deaths can only make a slasher movie better, right?"

Movie historian Leonard Maltin gave the film 2 out of a possible 4 stars; he described it as "...Too routine to succeed overall...Despite being based on a young-adult novel, this is absolutely not for kids. Still, it's a classic compared to the sequel."

Motion picture scholar Adam Rockoff notes in his book Going to Pieces: The Rise and Fall of the Slasher Film, 1978–1986 that, at the time of its release, many critics branded I Know What You Did Last Summer as an imitation of Scream. However, he contends that it is a "much different film", despite both screenplays being penned by the same writer:

Lois Duncan, the author of the original novel, heavily criticized the film adaptation; she stated in a 2002 interview she was "appalled" that her story was turned into a slasher film.

Accolades

Home media 
The film was released on DVD by Columbia TriStar Home Video in the US on June 16, 1998. Special features included a theatrical trailer and the filmmaker's commentary.

Sony Pictures Home Entertainment released the film on Blu-ray for the first time on July 22, 2008, with additional special features including the director's short film, Joyride. On 30 September 2014, Mill Creek Entertainment re-released the film on Blu-ray as a budget disc, featuring the film alone with no bonus materials.

Sequels 

The film was followed by I Still Know What You Did Last Summer (1998) and I'll Always Know What You Did Last Summer (2006). In the first sequel, Love Hewitt, Prinze Jr. and Watson reprise their roles. The second sequel has very little relation to the first two, other than the premise, the villain and the producers. It featured new characters and a different setting.

In February 2023, it was announced that a legacy sequel was in development with Love Hewitt and Prinze Jr. in negotiations to reprise their respective roles. Jennifer Kaytin Robinson would direct the film from a script written by Leah McKendrick, based on an idea by Robinson and McKendrick. Neal H. Moritz will serve as producer. The plot is said to be similar in approach to Scream (2022), in which characters from the original film are included in a story featuring a younger cast. That following month, Prinze Jr. said in an interview that he had not received an offer, explaining "They just said that to get people excited. I haven't spoken to anyone at their company, my agents haven't received an offer from them whatsoever".

Remakes 
This film was unofficially remade in India by Anil V. Kumar as Kucch To Hai (2003), starring Tusshar Kapoor. However, in an interview to Hindustan Times Kapoor denied that the makers of his film copied this particular film.

Also in 2003, another Indian remake was made entitled Dhund.

In September 2014, Sony Pictures revealed plans to remake the film, with Mike Flanagan and Jeff Howard writing the script. The film was a high priority and was initially set for release in 2016. Further, the new direction and scope of the film would need an estimated budget of $15–20 million. Flanagan confirmed that this new iteration of the franchise would not include elements of the 1973 novel (the antagonist being a central character) nor of the 1997 feature film (fisherman Ben Willis and the four protagonists Julie James, Helen Shivers, Barry Cox and Ray Bronson). However, the project was canceled.

Television adaptation 

A television series adaptation of the novel was announced in July 2019, with Neal H. Moritz and James Wan producing and Shay Hatten writing the pilot. Amazon ordered a straight-to-series order in October 2020.

In popular culture 
I Know What You Did Last Summer has been referenced in various films and television series, and its central plot was parodied at length in the spoof films Scary Movie (2000) and Shriek If You Know What I Did Last Friday the 13th (2000).

It was also spoofed in The Simpsons episode "Treehouse of Horror X" as "I Know What You Diddily-Iddily-Did", with Ned Flanders as the killer.

Notes

References

Works cited
 
 Gillespie, Jim; Mirkovich, Steve (1998). I Know What You Did Last Summer: Audio commentary (DVD). Columbia TriStar Home Video.

External links

 
 
 
 

I Know What You Did Last Summer (franchise)
1997 horror films
1997 films
1990s serial killer films
1990s slasher films
1990s teen horror films
Films about teenagers
American slasher films
American teen horror films
Films about stalking
Films based on American novels
Films based on thriller novels
Films based on urban legends
Films produced by Neal H. Moritz
Films set in 1996
Films set in 1997
Films set in 1998
Films set in Boston
Films set in North Carolina
Films shot in California
Films shot in North Carolina
Independence Day (United States) films
Columbia Pictures films
Mandalay Pictures films
Original Film films
Films scored by John Debney
Films directed by Jim Gillespie (director)
Films with screenplays by Kevin Williamson
Holiday horror films
1997 directorial debut films
Films about road accidents and incidents
Films about beauty pageants
1990s English-language films
1990s American films
Vigilante films
American vigilante films
American films about revenge